The Yellow Warehouse (Danish: Det Gule Pakhus),  is an 18th-century warehouse located at Toldbodgade 38 on the Larsens Plads waterfront in Copenhagen, Denmark.

History
The warehouse was built by Georg Erdman Rosenberg in 1777–83 for the Royal Greenland Company. It was listed in 1944 but severely damaged in a fire in 1968. It was restored by professor Hans Munk Hansen in the late 1970s.

Current use
The building has been converted into apartments.

See also
 Blue Warehouse

References

Warehouses in Copenhagen
Listed warehouses in Denmark
Commercial buildings completed in 1783